Kotakol Union is an Union Parishad under Lohagara Upazila of Narail District in the division of Khulna, Bangladesh. It has an area of 28.10 km2 (10.85 sq mi) and a population of 12,839.

References

Unions of Lohagara Upazila, Narail
Unions of Narail District
Unions of Khulna Division